Ubaldo Ranzi (18 July 1970) is a former Italian decathlete and bobsledder who competed in the late 1990s and the early 2000s.

Biography
Born in England to an Italian father and a British mother, he won a gold medal in the two-man event at the 1999 FIBT World Championships in Cortina d'Ampezzo and won a silver medal (with Gunther Huber), in 2000 always in Cortina d'Ampezzo.

Before starting his bobsleigh career he collected 6 caps in Italy national athletics team from 1993 to 1996. Ranzi held the fourth performance of all-time of Italy in the speciality of the decathlon.

Doping 
In 1998 Ranzi was found positive, Salbutamol, substance contained in Ventolin, used by asthmatics, as he was, at the Italian athletics championships. Ubaldo was allowed to use Ventolin being treated by the medical division of the athletic federation. 
The case, few days after being published by the italian national press (3rd of august 1999), was, by the same national press, DROPPED (16th of September 1999).
case: web|url=http://archiviostorico.gazzetta.it/1999/agosto/03/decathleta_Ranzi_trovato_positivo_giallo_ga_0_990803610.shtml|title=Il decathleta Ranzi trovato positivo. E' un giallo il suo oro iridato del bob|publisher=gazzetta.it|language=it|date=3 August 1999|access-date=9 April 2021}}</ref>
case DROPPED: 
http://archiviostorico.gazzetta.it//1999/settembre/16/Ranzi_caso_archiviato_ga_0_9909165069.shtml

National titles
Athletics
Ubaldo Ranzi has won several time the individual national championship.

See also
 Italian all-time lists - Decathlon

References

External links
 

Italian male bobsledders
Italian decathletes
Doping cases in athletics
Living people
Athletics competitors of Fiamme Azzurre
1970 births
Italian sportspeople in doping cases